The  was a class of patrol boats of the Imperial Japanese Navy (IJN), serving during World War II. 2 vessels were converted from s in 1940.

Background
 In 1939, the IJN was liberated from London Naval Treaty, and they built many s. On the other hand, aging of the Minekaze-class destroyers was serious. Their boilers were worn down very much because they were destroyers. Some Minekazes were not able to show 30 knots speed. The Navy General Staff made Confidential Document No.456, an order to rebuild about four Minekaze-class destroyers and six s into patrol boats. The IJN chose Shimakaze and Nadakaze among the Minekaze class.

Rebuilt
 Shimakaze and Nadakaze were sent to Yokosuka Naval Arsenal for rebuilding. B turret, four torpedo tubes, and two boilers were removed in 1940. In this point in time, they left a feature of the destroyer.
 Second half of 1941, the IJN rebuilt them once again for war preparations. They were rebuilt to the landing craft carrier. They were removed Y turret and torpedo tubes, and the enclosed well deck. Well-deck ruins were able to accommodate 250 troops (for two companies of Navy Landing Force).

Service
 8 December 1941: Sortie for invasion of Batanes Islands. (No.1 and No.2)
 24 December 1941: Sortie for invasion of Lamon Bay. (No.1 and No.2)
 11 January 1942: Sortie for Battle of Manado. (No.1, No.2 and No.34)
 12 February 1942: Sortie for invasion of Makassar. (No.1 and No.2)
 20 February 1942: Sortie for invasion of Kupang. (No.1, No.2 and No.39)
 (after): The IJN which finished First Phase Operations allotted them to the convoy escort operations and No.1 and No.2 were sunk by Allied submarines.

Ships in class

See also
 High speed transport

Footnotes

Bibliography
, History of Pacific War Vol.62, "Ships of the Imperial Japanese Forces", Gakken (Japan), January 2008, 
Monthly Ships of the World, Special issue Vol.45, "Escort Vessels of the Imperial Japanese Navy", (Japan), February 1996
The Maru Special, Japanese Naval Vessels No.49, "Japanese submarine chasers and patrol boats",  (Japan), March 1981

World War II naval ships of Japan
Minekaze-class destroyers
Landing craft
Patrol boat classes